Avro Vulcan XM655 is one of three remaining taxiable Avro Vulcan strategic bombers, the other two being XH558 and XL426. XM655 is currently owned by Wellesbourne Mountford Airfield and has been maintained by the 655 Maintenance & Preservation Society since 1998, who keep the aircraft in a taxiable condition.

History
XM655 was completed in November 1964 and was the antepenultimate Vulcan to be built. It is the youngest surviving example and the only operable Avro Vulcan with the more powerful Bristol Olympus 301 engines. Commissioned at Cottesmore in 1964, XM655 initially flew with Nos. 9, 12 and 35 Squadrons before moving to the Waddington Wing in 1967 to join Nos. 44, 50 and 101 Squadrons.

After service 
In 1984, XM655 was sold off to businessman Roy Jacobsen of Croydon, who intended to keep it airworthy, but the costs proved prohibitive, and the runway was too short for it to take off, so XM655 was left to deteriorate. Title of XM655 then passed to Radarmoor Ltd, the operating company of Wellesbourne Mountford Airfield, and the aircraft was registered in their name in January 1993.

After restoration work, XM655 made its first public taxi run at Wellesbourne Mountford Airfield on 16 February 1997, with another two runs later that year. Since then, XM655 made more or less annual public taxi runs, usually in June, as part of the Wellesbourne Wings and Wheels show, until 2016. At various of these events, the display of XM655 has been accompanied by flypasts by the BBMF, the Red Arrows and Avro Vulcan XH558. Events in 2017 and subsequent years were prevented by airfield development issues, and an event planned for 21 June 2020 was cancelled due to the COVID-19 pandemic, but an event is planned for 2021.

XM655 was also used by the crews of XH558 as required for currency and ground training.

Media appearances 

XM655 has appeared in several video documentaries about the Vulcan, Falklands operations and the Royal Air Force. Usually it has been used as a stand-in for the activities that cannot be filmed at the sites or on the aircraft featured.

Operators

Royal Air Force
No. 9 Squadron RAF
No. 12 Squadron RAF
No. 35 Squadron RAF
No. 44 Squadron RAF 
No. 50 Squadron RAF
No. 101 Squadron RAF
655 Maintenance & Preservation Society

Accidents and incidents
On Friday 16 September 2022, XM655 suffered a runway excursion at Wellesbourne Mountford Airfield when performing a ground run as practice for the following Sunday's public show.  This was due to a faulty air speed indicator, which resulted in the aircraft remaining at full power for approximately 2 seconds longer than intended.  This resulted in excessive speed and less distance in which to stop, and the aircraft passed beyond the end of the runway - stopping just before the airfield perimeter in mud which borders the B4086.  The air speed indicator had been tested and found satisfactory six days before the incident, which had started to work normally before the end of the run.  The aircraft's brakes worked properly, but were unable to bring the aircraft to a stop with the reduced distance available.

See also 

 Avro Vulcan XH558
 Avro Vulcan XL426

References

External links

Official Facebook page of the XM655 Maintenance and Preservation Society
Official website of the XM655 Maintenance and Preservation Society

Individual aircraft
XM655